Aure Atika (born 12 July 1970) is a French actress, writer and director.

Life and career

The daughter of Jewish-Moroccan Ode Atika Bitton and Frenchman Michel Fournier (his father was born in Algeria from the Aimeur family of film actors and directors), Atika was born in Portugal and grew up in Paris. She won the 2004 Best French-Language Short Film Award at the Créteil International Women's Film Festival for À quoi ça sert de voter écolo? (What's the Point of Voting Green?) (2003) and was nominated for the 2010 César Award for Best Supporting Actress for Mademoiselle Chambon (2009). Atika has one daughter, Angelica (February 2002), with Philippe Zdar of house music group, Cassius.

Filmography

Film

As director

Television

TV guest appearances

Awards and nominations
 award, 2004 Prix de la Fondation Beaumarchais, best short film, for À quoi ça sert de voter écolo? (2003).
 nomination, 2010 César du cinéma, for best supporting actress, for Mademoiselle Chambon (2009).
 nomination, 2014 Trophée francophone, for best actress, for Nesma (2013).

References

Further reading

External links

 

1970 births
Living people
French people of Moroccan-Jewish descent
French people of Portuguese-Jewish descent
Jewish French actresses
Jewish Portuguese actresses
French film actresses
French film directors
French women writers
French television actresses
20th-century French actresses
21st-century French actresses
People from Cascais
French women film directors
Portuguese people of Moroccan-Jewish descent
Portuguese people of French descent